Bayh is a surname. Notable people with the name include:

 Birch Bayh (coach) (Birch Evans Bayh Sr., 1893–1971), American basketball and baseball coach
 Birch Bayh (Birch Evans Bayh Jr., 1928–2019) U.S. Senator from Indiana
 Evan Bayh, (Birch Evans Bayh III, born 1955) U.S. Senator and governor of Indiana
 Marvella Bayh (1933–1979), wife of Indiana Senator Birch Bayh
 Susan Bayh (1959–2021), American attorney and First Lady of Indiana